"Tales from the Vienna Woods" (occasionally ) is a waltz by Johann Strauss II.

Composed in 1868, Op. 325, was one of six Viennese waltzes by Johann Strauss II which featured a virtuoso part for zither. The title of Strauss' dance recalls the folk music of the inhabitants of the Vienna Woods.

Composition notes 
The waltz's introduction is one of the longest he ever wrote for a waltz, 119 bars in the musical score. It starts in C major, intertwining with F major before gaining ascendancy in volume and mood, finishing with a long pause. The second part is in the key of G major, with a solo violin incorporating material which appears again in successive waltz sections. A short flute cadenza evoking birdsong comes in, and moves on to the zither solo, marked moderato. The zither part involves two sub-sections of its own; the slowish ländler tempo and its more vigorous counterpart, with the direction of vivace (quickly). If the zither is unavailable, a string quartet plays the zither themes instead. Loud orchestral chords bring the waltz back to the familiar waltz theme in F major.

Waltz sections 2A and 2B are in B-flat major, whereas waltz 3A is in E-flat major with a quick section in B-flat in waltz 3B. The entire waltz section 4 is in B-flat as well, and waltz section 5 is wholly in E-flat. Waltz 5B contains the customary climax with cymbals and is loudly played. After a brief and tense coda, waltz 1A and 2B make a reappearance. As the waltz approaches its end, the zither solo makes another appearance, reprising its earlier melody in the introduction. A crescendo in the final bars concludes with a brass flourish and snare drumroll.

Orchestration 

Woodwinds
2 Flutes (Fl. 2 doubling Piccolo)
2 Oboes
2 Clarinets in C
 Cl. 1 doubling in B-flat
 Cl. 2 doubling E-flat clarinet
2 Bassoons

Brass
4 Horns in F
3 Trumpets in F
2 Trombones
Bass trombone
Tuba

Percussion
Timpani
Snare drum
Triangle
Bass drum
Cymbals

Strings
Zither
Harp
Violins I, II
Violas
Violoncellos
Double basses

A string ensemble (for example, four violins, two violas, and two cellos) may be substituted in the absence of a zither.

In popular culture 
The Kleist Prize-winning drama Geschichten aus dem Wiener Wald (1931), by Ödön von Horváth and the live-action films Tales from the Vienna Woods (1928) and Tales from the Vienna Woods (1934) take their titles from this waltz, as does the MGM cartoon short Tales from the Vienna Woods (1934)

The waltz was also featured prominently in the 1943 Merrie Melodies animated short A Corny Concerto and the 1987 television film Escape from Sobibor.

References

External links
 

Waltzes by Johann Strauss II
Vienna Woods
1868 compositions